The volleyball tournaments at the 2020 Summer Olympics in Tokyo were played between 24 July and 8 August 2021. 24 volleyball teams and 48 beach volleyball teams participated in the tournament. The indoor volleyball competition took place at Ariake Arena in Ariake, and the beach volleyball tournament at Shiokaze Park, in the temporary Shiokaze Park Stadium.

It was originally scheduled to take place in 2020, but due to the COVID-19 pandemic, the IOC and the Tokyo 2020 Organising Committee announced on 24 March 2020 that the 2020 Summer Olympics would be delayed to 2021.

Schedule

Medal summary

Medal table

Medalists

Indoor volleyball

Beach volleyball

Qualification summary
This qualification pathways were confirmed by the Fédération Internationale de Volleyball on 23 September 2018.

Men's volleyball

Women's volleyball

Men's beach volleyball

Women's beach volleyball

Men's indoor tournament

Pool A

Pool B

Knockout stage

Final standings

Women's indoor tournament

Pool A

Pool B

Knockout stage

Final standings

Men's beach volleyball competition

Knockout stage

Final standings

Women's beach volleyball competition

Knockout stage

Final standings

See also
Volleyball at the 2018 Asian Games
Volleyball at the 2019 Pan American Games
Sitting volleyball at the 2020 Summer Paralympics

References

External links
 Results book – Beach Volleyball 
 Results book – Volleyball 

 
2020 Summer Olympics events
2020
2021 in volleyball
Olympic
Volleyball events postponed due to the COVID-19 pandemic